Bands of Mercy were formal, locally led organizations that brought people—especially children and adolescents—together to learn about kindness to non-human animals. The Bands would also work to help animals and prevent cruelty in their area through humane education and direct action.

Creation

Modelled after the Band of Hope of the temperance movement, the first Bands of Mercy were created in 1875, by the philanthropist Catherine Smithies in Britain. The first Band of Mercy was formed at the house of Hannah Bevan. The movement had a periodical, Band of Mercy Advocate (1879–1934), which was originally edited by Smithies' son Thomas Bywater Smithies. In 1882, the Royal Society for the Prevention of Cruelty to Animals (RSPCA) assumed responsibility for organizing and promoting the Band of Mercy and its publications.

The Band of Mercy movement soon spread to Australia, Canada and US.

Movement to North America
Following the British model, George T. Angell, founder and first president of the Massachusetts Society for the Prevention of Cruelty to Animals (MSPCA), and the Rev. Thomas Timmins began the formation of Bands of Mercy in the United States in 1882. Many locally run Bands of Mercy were created across North America in the subsequent decades. By the early part of the 20th century, more than 260,000 children—about 3% of the children aged 5–9 years old in 1900—were active members in over 27,000 local Bands of Mercy across North America.

Activities
Angell said that the goals of the Bands of Mercy were to "teach and lead every child and older person to seize every opportunity to say a kind word or do a kind act that will make some other human being or some dumb [i.e., that cannot speak] creature happier."
 
Bands of Mercy were locally organized and run, even though they often used materials that were created and distributed nationally by the MSPCA and later the ASPCA. Consequently, there were many local variations to the activities of the Bands. In general, though, Bands of Mercy would hold regular meetings that began with the members pledging: "I will try to be kind to all living creatures, and try to protect them from cruel usage." Adults would often then conduct lessons to promote kindness towards and concern for all animals. These lessons often involved reading stories and singing songs and hymns. At least two song collections made these available for Band meetings: Songs of Happy Life for Schools, Homes, and Bands of Mercy (Providence RI and London, 1897) by American Sarah J. Eddy and Hymns for Children with Opening and Closing Services and Songs and Hymns for Bands of Mercy and of Hope (London, 1894), edited by Charlotte Farrington. The Band of Mercy Advocate, established by Thomas Bywater Smithies in England in 1879, printed songs in every issue. Clapp-Itnyre writes that singing filled a crucial void: "to bring language--and aesthetically pleasing language at that--to a population of animals unable to speak in their own defense."

Membership was not limited to children and adolescents; adults would hold officer positions and would use the Bands as a forum to discuss animal cruelty issues and how to handle them. An article dated 18 July 1899 in the San Francisco Call about their local Band of Mercy, for example, mentions members reporting on the number of animal cruelty cases that had been reported in the last year (2,379) along with the resulting numbers of prosecutions (195) and convictions (129).

Post-War Decreases
Prior to the world wars, humane education—and the Bands of Mercy where children learned about it—was seen by many as a possible way to create a kinder and more peaceful world. The world wars dispelled much of this belief and thus the interest in Bands of Mercy. The red scare and the space race also focused much of U.S. education towards math and science, further reducing the immediate post-war interest in Bands of Mercy. In addition, the creation and maintenance of the Bands of Mercy was primarily driven by animal welfare organizations; as their attention and goals shifted away from early prevention to active intervention in abuse, much of the energy behind the Bands of Mercy dissipated.

Although membership in the Bands of Mercy faded dramatically after World War II, humane education continued in many other forms. It continues to be practised around the world, and may be experiencing especially strong growth in China and Japan.

References

Further reading 

 Bands of Mercy Exhibit in National Museum of Animals and Society's Be Kind: A Visual History of Humane Education, 1880–1945

 Clapp-Itnyre, Alisa. "Reforming Society: Missionary, Bands of Hope, and Bands of Mercy Hymns" (Chapter Five), in British Hymn Books for Children, 1800-1900. Farnham, Surrey: Ashgate/Routledge, 2016.
Clapp-Itnyre, Alisa. "Advocating for the Least of These: Empowering Children and Animals in The Band of Mercy Advocate." Chapter 5 in Animals and Their Children in Victorian Culture. Ed. Brenda Ayres and Sarah E. Maier. NY and London: Routledge, 2020. Pp. 87-105.

1875 establishments in the United Kingdom
1882 establishments in the United States
Animal welfare organizations based in the United States
Humane education
Organizations established in 1875